Jim Bolger (born 1935) was the Prime Minister of New Zealand from 1990 to 1997.

James or Jim Bolger may also refer to:

Jim Bolger (baseball) (1932–2020), American Major League Baseball player
Jim Bolger (racehorse trainer) (born 1941), Irish horse trainer
James Bolger, character in 11/11/11

See also
 James Bulger (disambiguation)